Amycolatopsis albidoflava is a bacterium from the genus Amycolatopsis which has been isolated from soil.

References

Pseudonocardiales
Bacteria described in 2001